The 1974 New York Cosmos season was the fourth season for the New York Cosmos in the now-defunct North American Soccer League. In the Cosmos' fourth year of existence the club finished last in the four-team Northern Division and 13th out of 15 in the overall league table, failing to qualify for the playoffs for the first time in their short history.

Squad 

 

Source:

Results 
Source:

Friendlies

Regular season 
Pld = Games Played, W = Wins, L = Losses, D = Draws, GF = Goals For, GA = Goals Against, Pts = Points
6 points for a win, 3 points for a draw, 0 points for a loss, 1 point for each goal scored (up to three per game).

Northern Division Standings

Overall League Placing 

Source:

Matches

References

See also
1974 North American Soccer League season
List of New York Cosmos seasons

New York
American soccer clubs 1974 season
New York Cosmos seasons
New York Cosmos